Blagoveshchensky (masculine), Blagoveshchenskaya (feminine), or Blagoveshchenskoye (neuter) is the name of several rural localities in Russia:
Blagoveshchensky, Republic of Bashkortostan, a khutor in Zilairsky Selsoviet of Zilairsky District of the Republic of Bashkortostan
Blagoveshchensky, Bryansk Oblast, a settlement in Berezhansky Selsoviet of Karachevsky District of Bryansk Oblast
Blagoveshchensky, Kursk Oblast, a settlement in Volkovsky Selsoviet of Zheleznogorsky District of Kursk Oblast
Blagoveshchensky, Buturlinovsky District, Voronezh Oblast, a settlement in Karaychevskoye Rural Settlement of Buturlinovsky District of Voronezh Oblast
Blagoveshchensky, Kalacheyevsky District, Voronezh Oblast, a khutor in Maninskoye Rural Settlement of Kalacheyevsky District of Voronezh Oblast
Blagoveshchenskoye, Kirov Oblast, a selo in Yumsky Rural Okrug of Svechinsky District of Kirov Oblast
Blagoveshchenskoye, Kurgan Oblast, a selo in Blagoveshchensky Selsoviet of Shumikhinsky District of Kurgan Oblast
Blagoveshchenskoye, Moscow Oblast, a village under the administrative jurisdiction of the town of Dmitrov in Dmitrovsky District of Moscow Oblast
Blagoveshchenskoye, Nizhny Novgorod Oblast, a selo in Blagoveshchensky Selsoviet of Voskresensky District of Nizhny Novgorod Oblast
Blagoveshchenskoye, Vladimir Oblast, a selo in Muromsky District of Vladimir Oblast